is a Japanese professional drifting driver and businessman, the former, currently competing in the D1 Grand Prix series for Car Make T&E.

He started out with a love for the Toyota Soarer JZZ30 and driving, and has turned it into a huge success. Starting his Tuning shop Car Make T&E in October 1996, it has gone from strength to strength, now being recognised as one of the best in Japan. Founding the aero part branch, Vertex on the philosophy of simplicity and elegance, he personally approves every new design. Most of the company's time when it was starting out was spent on developing the Toyota Soarer JZZ30 and this still continues today, using the D1 Grand Prix as a showcase.

He began competing in the D1 Grand Prix in his Toyota Soarer JZZ30 in the first round in 2001. He instantly made an impression showing great skill in the control of such a heavy car as the Soarer. Going on to win round 4 of the season and finishing in third overall in the championship. He has gone on to score points in every year since, though has never quite matched his original success.

From 2009 to 2015, he had used BMW M3 (E92).

In 2016, celebrated the 20th anniversary of Car Make T&E, he started using Toyota Soarer JZZ30 again.

Currently he has been competing in the D1GP, driving Lexus RC since 2019.

Complete Drifting Results

D1 Grand Prix

Sources
D1 Grand Prix

Japanese racing drivers
Drifting drivers
1971 births
Living people
D1 Grand Prix drivers